State Road 360 (NM 360) is a  state highway in the US state of New Mexico. NM 360's southern terminus is at U.S. Route 62 (US 62) and US 180 northeast of Carlsbad, and the northern terminus is at US 82 east-southeast of Artesia.

Major intersections

See also

References

360
Transportation in Eddy County, New Mexico